Gregor Fisher (born 22 December 1953) is a Scottish comedian and actor. He is best known for his portrayal of the title character in the comedy series Rab C. Nesbitt, a role he has played since the show's first episode in 1988. He has also had roles in films such as Without a Clue (1988), Love Actually (2003), The Merchant of Venice (2004) and Whisky Galore! (2016).

Early life
Fisher was born in Menstrie, Clackmannanshire, and following the death of his mother was brought up in Edinburgh, Langholm, and Neilston and attended Barrhead High School. He attended the Royal Scottish Academy of Music and Drama in Glasgow, at which he did not complete his studies.

Career
Fisher worked with Scottish comedian Rikki Fulton on his hit sketch series Scotch and Wry (whose broadcast was mainly restricted to BBC One Scotland). Another Scottish comedian he worked with was Hector Nicol, in the BBC drama Just a Boys' Game (1979).

Later, he appeared in Michael Radford's 1984 film Nineteen Eighty-Four as Winston Smith's neighbour Parsons. In 1988, he had a leading role in Silent Mouse, a dramatised television documentary telling the story of the creation of the Christmas carol Silent Night. In the same year he had a cameo (as a Victorian policeman) in the Michael Caine/Ben Kingsley vehicle, Without a Clue.

Fisher is best known for his portrayal of his character Rab C. Nesbitt in the sitcom of the same name, this itself was a spin-off from the BBC2 sketch comedy Naked Video, where the Nesbitt character originated, along with The Baldy Man who also obtained his own eponymous spin-off series, and is particularly associated with two Hamlet adverts involving photography, the first of which where he cannot get a satisfactory passport photo from a photobooth and lights up a cigar to calm himself down; the second of which where he cannot get a satisfactory family portrait and lights up a cigar to calm himself down. Johnny Depp based his Glaswegian accent for the role of Tarrant Hightopp, The  Mad Hatter in the 2010 film Alice in Wonderland, on that used by Fisher’s Rab C. Nesbitt character.

In 1994/95, he played the title role in the BBC series The Tales of Para Handy, in which he was reunited with Rikki Fulton. Fisher had also appeared in the 1999 sitcom Brotherly Love and in the 2002 sitcom Snoddy. He also appeared with Iain Glenn in the BBC Masterpiece theatre version of Kidnapped.

Fisher appeared in the 2000 BBC adaptation of Gormenghast. Fisher starred as a main character D.S. Doug Duvall in the drama Missing, made by SMG Productions in 2006: however, the two-part thriller was not broadcast on STV until November 2008. In November 2006, he starred as Grandpa Potts in Chitty Chitty Bang Bang, in a three-month run of the show in Edinburgh. Most recently he has starred in the BBC's adaption of Oliver Twist, in the role of Mr Bumble.

In 2003, he appeared in the romantic comedy film Love Actually, where he played the role of the manager to fading music star, Billy Mack (Bill Nighy). In 2004, he played the role of Solanio in the Michael Radford film, The Merchant of Venice.

In an interview in The Metro on 20 February 2008 he stated that he is no longer recognised as Rab C. Nesbitt, and rather is more likely to be stopped by fans for his recent role as Mr Bumble in Oliver Twist.

Empty, a comedy series starring Fisher, began on BBC2 on 28 February 2008. On BBC2, on 23 December 2008, he reprised his role as Rab C Nesbitt in a Christmas special.

Fisher's autobiography, The Boy from Nowhere, was published in 2015. To coincide with the publication, BBC One Scotland broadcast a documentary, In Search of Gregor Fisher, which followed Fisher and ghostwriter Melanie Reid during part of their research for the book.

Filmography

References

External links
 Overview of Gregor Fisher

1953 births
Alumni of the Royal Conservatoire of Scotland
Living people
People from Clackmannanshire
Male actors from Glasgow
Scottish male film actors
Scottish male television actors
Scottish male comedians